Herbert Hart may refer to:

 H. L. A. Hart (1907–1992), British legal philosopher
 Herbert Hart (cricketer) (1859–1895), English cricketer
 Herbert Hart (general) (1882–1968), New Zealand Military Forces officer
 Herbert L. Hart (1897–1988), American college football player and coach